Ypsilanti Charter Township is a charter township of Washtenaw County in the U.S. state of Michigan. The population was 53,362 at the 2010 census. The city of Ypsilanti is mostly surrounded by the township, but the two are administered autonomously.

Communities
The community is located along the Huron River and Belleville Lake and also extends to the east in Van Buren Township in Wayne County. 
It was named after the Willow Run, which is a small stream and tributary of the Huron River. It is the site of Willow Run Airport. In 1943, the federal government constructed a bomber plant, which was operated by Henry Ford during World War II. A community named Willow Village was constructed to house the workers of the facility and their families, and it was also given a post office until the bomber plant closed on June 30, 1945. 
 Woodgruff's Grove is a former community that was settled in 1823 by Ohio native Benjamin Woodruff.  A post office operated in Woodgruff's Grove from May 9, 1825 until January 28, 1828.  At the time, the community was administratively part of Wayne County when Ypsilanti Township was created in 1827.  Washtenaw County was created in 1829 within the Michigan Territory.  The community became part of the village of Ypsilanti when it incorporated in 1832.

Geography

Ford Lake Dam is located in the eastern part of the township.  Ford Lake is within the township along the Huron River, and Paint Creek also runs through the township.  The Border-to-Border Trail runs through the township along the Huron River.

Major highways
 runs east–west though the township and forms part of the boundary with the city of Ypsilanti.
 enters the township in the northeast corner and runs concurrently with I-94 through most of the township.
 begins at US 12 and runs through the township, in and out of the city of Ypsilanti.

Demographics
As of 2010 Ypsilanti Township had a population of 53,362.  The racial and ethnic makeup of the population was 58.4% white, 32.8% black or African American, 0.4% Native American, 2.1% Asian, 0.1% Pacific Islander, 1.6% from some other race and 4.6% from two or more races.  4.6% were Hispanic or Latino of any race.

As of the census of 2000, there were 49,182 people, 20,194 households, and 12,338 families residing in the township. The racial makeup of the township was 67.51% White, 25.47% African American, 0.49% Native American, 2.01% Asian, 0.03% Pacific Islander, 1.20% from other races, and 3.30% from two or more races. Hispanic or Latino of any race were 2.80% of the population.

There were 20,194 households, out of which 31.1% had children under the age of 18 living with them, 41.5% were married couples living together, 14.9% had a female householder with no husband present, and 38.9% were non-families. 29.7% of all households were made up of individuals, and 5.3% had someone living alone who was 65 years of age or older.  The average household size was 2.43 and the average family size was 3.06.

In the township the population was spread out, with 26.3% under the age of 18, 11.1% from 18 to 24, 35.3% from 25 to 44, 20.2% from 45 to 64, and 7.2% who were 65 years of age or older. The median age was 31 years. For every 100 females, there were 96.5 males. For every 100 females age 18 and over, there were 94.1 males.

The median income for a household in the township was $46,460, and the median income for a family was $55,131. Males had a median income of $41,298 versus $29,732 for females. The per capita income for the township was $22,970.  About 8.0% of families and 10.5% of the population were below the poverty line, including 14.8% of those under age 18 and 6.4% of those age 65 or over.

Economy
Kalitta Air and National Airlines (5M), cargo airlines, are headquartered at Willow Run Airport in the township.

Education

Ypsilanti Charter Township is served by two separate public school districts.  The southern section of the township approximately south of Ford Lake is served by Lincoln Consolidated School District in August Charter Township.  The northern portion of the township, including the autonomous city of Ypsilanti, is served by Ypsilanti Community Schools.  Portions of the township were also served by Willow Run Community Schools until it was consolidated into Ypsilanti Community Schools in 2013. Ypsilanti Community High School is located within the township.        

Global Educational Excellence, based in Ann Arbor, operates the Global Tech Academy (PreK–5) in the township.

Government
Charter Township of Ypsilanti government officials:
 Supervisor: Brenda Stumbo
 Clerk: Heather Jarrell Roe
 Treasurer: Larry Doe
 Trustee: Stan Eldridge
 Trustee: John Newman
 Trustee: Monica Ross-Williams
 Trustee: Jimmie Wilson

Notable parks 
 Ford Heritage Park
 Ford Lake Park
 Hewens Creek Park
 North Bay Park
 Pine View Golf Course
 Rolling Hills

Notable people 
Edward P. Allen, politician.
Martha Bablitch, Wisconsin Court of Appeals judge.
Owen Cleary, Michigan Secretary of State.
Amy Devers, furniture designer and television host.
Clayton Eshleman, poet and translator.
Carol Fox, figure skater.
Ralph Gerganoff, architect.
William H. Joslin, member of the Wisconsin State Assembly.
Charles Kettles, Medal of Honor recipient.
Bernard Kirk, American football player.
Christian Longo - Murderer
Shara Nova, singer and songwriter.
Keith Simons, American football player.
Larry Soderquist, Author and Professor of Law.
David P. Weikart, psychologist.

Images

References

Sources

External links

 Ypsilanti Charter Township official website

Townships in Washtenaw County, Michigan
Charter townships in Michigan
Populated places established in 1827
1827 establishments in Michigan Territory